Shoʻrchi is a district of Surxondaryo Region in Uzbekistan. The capital lies at the city Shoʻrchi.

Settlements
The district consists of one city (Shoʻrchi), 10 urban-type settlements (Elbayon, Toʻla, Yalti, Xushchekka, Qoʻshtegirmon, Kattasovur, Karvon, Gʻarmaqoʻrgʻon, Jarqishloq, Joyilma) and 10 rural communities (Qoʻldosh, Alpomish, Baxtlitepa, Savur, Elobod, Sohibkor, Dalvarzin, Jaloir, Shoʻrchi, Yangibozor).

Natives
Shavkat Rakhmonov ― UFC welterweight Mixed-Martial artist is born in Shoʻrchi.

References

Districts of Uzbekistan
Surxondaryo Region